Tanga Byaling is an Indian politician from the state of Arunachal Pradesh.

Taram was elected unopposed from Nacho seat in the 2014 Arunachal Pradesh Legislative Assembly election, standing as a People's Party of Arunachal candidate.

See also
 Arunachal Pradesh Legislative Assembly

References

External links
 Tanga Byaling profile
 MyNeta Profile

People's Party of Arunachal politicians
Indian National Congress politicians
Living people
Arunachal Pradesh MLAs 2014–2019
Bharatiya Janata Party politicians from Arunachal Pradesh
Year of birth missing (living people)